is a former Japanese football player.

Playing career
Oishi was born in Shizuoka Prefecture on May 23, 1974. After graduating from Shizuoka Gakuen High School, he joined Yokohama Flügels in 1993. In first season, he debuted in J.League Cup. Although he played several matches J1 League in 1994 and 1995 season, he could not play many matches. He could not play at all in the match in 1996 and retired end of 1996 season.

Club statistics

References

External links

1974 births
Living people
Association football people from Shizuoka Prefecture
Japanese footballers
J1 League players
Yokohama Flügels players
Association football defenders